Stuart Crainer (born 1962) is an author, editor, adviser and entrepreneur.

He is co-founder of Thinkers50, the global platform for management ideas. His book credits include The Financial Times Handbook of Management, The Management Century and a biography of the management guru Tom Peters.

He is a former columnist to The (London) Times and contributing editor to the American magazine Strategy+Business. 

In the 1990s he also worked as a ghostwriter on a number of bestselling business books and was editor of the award-winning magazine Business Strategy Review. 

His long-time co-author and business partner is Des Dearlove. Their books, available in more than 15 languages, include Gravy Training and Generation Entrepreneur. His work with Dearlove in business thought leadership led Management Today to describe them as “market makers par excellence”.

Crainer is an adjunct professor at IE Business School in Madrid, director of the Business Ecosystem Alliance and is also the author of Atlantic Crossing.

Selected publications 
 The Decline and Rise of British Industry (with David Clutterbuck), Mercury, 1988
 Makers of Management (with David Clutterbuck), Macmillan, 1990
 Zeebrugge: Learning from Disaster, HFA, 1993
 What Do High Performance Managers Really Do? (with Phil Hodgson), Pitman, 1993
 The Financial Times Handbook of Management (ed.), FT Pitman, 1995
 The Real Power of Brands, Pitman, 1995
 Making Re-engineering Happen (with Eddie Obeng), Pitman, 1995
 How to Have a Brilliant Career, Pitman, 1995
 The Future of Leadership (with Phil Hodgson and Randall White), Financial Times Prentice Hall, 1996
 The Tom Peters Phenomenon, Capstone, 1997
 The Ultimate Business Library, Capstone, 1997
 The Ultimate Business Guru Book, Capstone, 1997
 The Ultimate Book of Business Quotations, Capstone, 1997
 Leaders on Leadership (ed.), Pitman, 1998
 Key Management Ideas, Financial Times Pitman, 1998
 Which Executive Programme?, Economist Intelligence Unit, 1998
 Gravy Training: Inside the Business of Business School, Jossey Bass, 1999
 The 75 Greatest Management Decisions, Amacom, 1999
 The Ultimate Book of Business Brands, Capstone, 1999
 The Freethinker’s A-Z of the New World of Business, Capstone, 1999
 MBA Planet (with Des Dearlove), Financial Times Prentice Hall, 2000
 The Financial Times Handbook of Management (ed. second edition), FT Pitman, 2000
 Generation Entrepreneur (with Des Dearlove), Financial Times Prentice Hall, 2000
 The Management Century, Jossey Bass, 2000
 Business Minds (with Tom Brown, Des Dearlove and Jorge Nascimento Rodrigues), FT Prentice Hall, 2001
 Firestarters! (with Des Dearlove), Financial Times Prentice Hall, 2001
 Leadership the Sven-Goran Eriksson Way (with Julian Birkinshaw), Capstone, 2002
 The Career Adventurer’s Fieldbook (with Steve Coomber and Des Dearlove), Capstone, 2002
 Business, the Universe and Everything (with Des Dearlove), Capstone, 2003
 The Financial Times Handbook of Management (ed. with Des Dearlove, third edition), Financial Times Prentice Hall, 2004
 The Business World Atlas (with Des Dearlove), Meteor Press, 2006
 Atlantic Crossing, St Giles Poets, 2015
 Dear CEO (with Des Dearlove, editors), Bloomsbury, 2017
 Ecosystems Inc. (editor), Thinkers50, 2020

References

External links 
 Stuart Crainer & Des Dearlove, co-founders of Thinkers50

1960s births
Living people
British business theorists
Academic staff of IE University